Villena is a city and municipality in the province of Alicante.

Villena may also refer to:
Seigneury of Villena, an ancient feudal state of southern Spain

People with the name 
 Enrique de Villena, Spanish medieval writer and scientist.
 Luis Antonio de Villena, contemporary Spanish poet and writer

See also 
 Treasure of Villena, a find of gold of the European Bronze Age